Lato pros Kamara or simply Kamara or Camara was an ancient city of Crete, situated to the east of Olous (Ptol. iii. 17. § 5), at a distance of 15 stadia according to the Maritime Itinerary, currently the site of Agios Nikolaos, Crete. Lato pros Kamara was settled in the late Bronze Age as the population of Dorian Lato realised greater security and its expanding population settled the coastal area, which had been subject to greater likelihood of marine attack during the earlier Bronze Age. (Hogan, 2008) Xenion, a Cretan historian quoted by Stephanus of Byzantium (s. v.) says that it was once called "Lato" (Hoeck, Kreta, vol. i. pp. 10, 394, 116); however, modern scholarship distinguish the two (see, e.g.), placing Lato pros Kamara as the port of Lato. Lato pros Kamara outlasted Lato well into Roman times.

See also
Lato
Agios Nikolaos, Crete

References
Notes

Sources

C.Michael Hogan (2008) Lato, The Modern Antiquarian
Martha W. Baldwin Bowsky, Portrait of a Polis: Lato Pros Kamara (Crete) in the Late Second Century B. C., Hesperia, Vol. 58, No. 3 (July - September 1989), pp. 331–47
Tourism website of the area

Ruins in Greece
Port settlements in ancient Crete
Former populated places in Greece
Populated places in ancient Crete